LIFE Church UK, British Christian organisation
 Life.Church, American Evangelical organisation
 Life Church, Edinburgh, a congregation of the Apostolic Church in Edinburgh, Scotland
 Life Church, aka Life Christian Centre, in Angas Street, Adelaide, South Australia